Felisbertia is a genus of fungi in the family Dermateaceae. This is a monotypic genus, containing the single species Felisbertia melastomacearum.

See also 

 List of Dermateaceae genera

References

External links 

 Felisbertia at Index Fungorum

Dermateaceae genera
Monotypic Helotiales genera